Vallerville, also called Vallersville, is a village in Plymouth, Massachusetts,
United States, the smallest village in the town. It is located south of the village of Manomet and north of the village of Ellisville. The neighborhoods of Ocean Aire Beach, Surfside Beach and Bayside Beach are located within Vallerville.

See also
 Neighborhoods in Plymouth, Massachusetts

Villages in Plymouth, Massachusetts
Villages in Massachusetts